Inermomulciber schultzei is a species of beetle in the family Cerambycidae, and the only species in the genus Inermomulciber. It was described by Breuning in 1974.

References

Homonoeini
Beetles described in 1974